Denman Mountain is a mountain in Sullivan County, New York. It is located north of Grahamsville. Sugarloaf Mountain is located east-southeast and Blue Hill is located west-northwest of Denman Mountain. It is the highest peak within the Sullivan county portion of the Catskill mountains.

References

Mountains of Sullivan County, New York
Mountains of New York (state)